Tsendiin Nyamdorj (1956) is a Mongolian politician. He is the current Minister of Justice and the Internal Affairs and currently serving as the Speaker (Chairman) of the State Great Khural (parliament) from July 2005 to June 2007. Nyamdorj is a member of the Dörvöd tribe.

Life 
Nyamdorj was born 1956 in the Malchin sum of Uvs Aimag (province). He studied law in Leningrad and made his degree in 1981. After that he worked as an attorney general. From 1988 he worked for the council of ministers. Between 1990 and 1992 he was deputy minister of justice. Since 1992 he is a member of Parliament for the Mongolian People's Revolutionary Party (MPRP), representing constituency #39 in the Uvs Aimag.

From 2000 to 2004 he served as Minister of Justice and the Interior.

In 2005 he succeeded Nambar Enkhbayar as the Chairman of the State Great Khural. In April 2007, the constitutional court decided that Nyamdorj had violated the constitution by unilaterally changing the text of several laws from the version approved by parliament. The DP fraction demanded that Nyamdorj resign, but the MPRP dominating the parliament tried to help him to keep his position as chairman. He resigned on June 12, 2007.

References

External links 
 The State Great Khural official site.

1956 births
Living people
Speakers of the State Great Khural
Members of the State Great Khural
Oirats
Mongolian People's Party politicians
Interior ministers of Mongolia
Justice ministers of Mongolia
People from Uvs Province
Mongolian expatriates in the Soviet Union